Pulloxhill Grange was a priory in Bedfordshire, England. It is a Grade II listed building.

In 1535, Dunstable Priory received from Woburn Abbey 5s. for land it held in Pulloxhill. In 1291, the value of the abbey's estates in Pulloxhill was £7 2s. 5d.
In 1330, the abbey claimed sac and soc in Pulloxhill.
In 1547, after the Dissolution of the monasteries, Pulloxhill Grange, was granted to Sir William Pagett.

See also 
 List of monastic houses in Bedfordshire

References 

Monasteries in Bedfordshire